Khaled Mahdi may refer to:

 Khaled Mahdi (footballer) (born 1987), Palestinian footballer 
 Khaled A. Mahdi (born 1970), Kuwaiti government official